Uttar Pradesh Power Corporation Limited (UPPCL) is the company responsible for electricity transmission and distribution within the Indian state of Uttar Pradesh. The incumbent chairman is Shri M. Devraj.

Restructuring 

For efficient operation & management, UPPCL is further restructured into:

 Dakshinanchal Vidyut Vitaran Nigam Limited (DVVNL) - Agra Zone Discom
 Madhyanchal Vidyut Vitaran Nigam Limited (MVVNL) - Lucknow,Ayodhya Zone Discom
 Pashchimanchal Vidyut Vitaran Nigam Limited (PVVNL) - Meerut Zone Discom
 Purvanchal Vidyut Vitaran Nigam Limited (PUVVNL) - Prayagraj, Varanasi Zone Discom
 Kanpur Electricity Supply Company (KESCO) - Kanpur City Discom
 Lucknow Electricity Supply Administration (LESA) - Lucknow City Discom
 Uttar Pradesh Power Transmission Corporation Limited (UPPTCL) - State Transmission Utility

Power Procurement 

UPPCL procures power from state government owned power generators (Uttar Pradesh Rajya Vidyut Utpadan Nigam & Uttar Pradesh Jal Vidyut Nigam Limited), central government owned power generators (NTPC Limited & THDC Ltd) and independent power producers - IPP (mostly private power companies) through power purchase agreement for lowest per unit cost of electricity.

Financial Condition & Line losses 

The total loss of the UPPCL for the year ended on 31 March 2017 is estimated to be ₹ 8,825 crores. Thus, UPPCL is finding it hard to make payment to state, central and other private power companies against electricity procurement.

The causes of such a poor financial conditions include:

 Higher line losses due to aging over stressed infrastructure
 Pilferage of power at large scale
 Inferior quality of transformers and other equipments
 Widespread corruption
 Inefficient use of IT enabled infrastructure for administrative as well as technical purposes

Discom-wise Aggregate Technical & Commercial (AT&C) Loss / Total line losses (in %) for period 2010-11:
 Dakshinanchal Vidyut Vitaran Nigam Limited (DVVNL) - 46.80%
 Madhyanchal Vidyut Vitaran Nigam Limited (MVVNL) - 39.10%

 Pashchimanchal Vidyut Vitaran Nigam Limited (PVVNL) - 31.60%
 Purvanchal Vidyut Vitaran Nigam Limited (PUVVNL) - 29.72%

Power Plants SPVs 

In line of Power Finance Corporation, UPPCL created Special Purpose Vehicles (SPVs):

 To attract private investment in implementation of New Power Plant Projects in state of Uttar Pradesh
 To meet the growing power demand of Uttar Pradesh state
 To procure power at lowest possible feasible rates

The role of SPVs are - 

 Preparing feasibility report (including Technology, Size, Coal linkages, Land & Water issues), 
 Clearances (including environment clearances) & land acquisition, etc. 

These SPVs are transferred to developer private company through bidding for lowest per unit cast of selling electricity to UPPCL.

UPPCL SPVs:

 Bara Thermal Power Project, Prayagraj Power Generation Company Limited (Tehsil - Bara, Distt. Allahabad) - 3 x 660 MW
 Tanda thermal power plant (Ambedkar Nagar district)
- 4× 1680 MW
- 4× 660 MW

 Karchana Thermal Power Station, Sangam Power Generation Company Limited (Tehsil - Karchana, Distt. Allahabad) - 2 x 660 MW (Under Construction)

References 

Electric power distribution network operators in India
Government-owned energy companies of Uttar Pradesh
Companies based in Lucknow
1999 establishments in Uttar Pradesh
Energy companies established in 1999
Indian companies established in 1999